Laelia speciosa, commonly known as the Mayflower orchid, is a species of showy orchid found in area of Mexico with high elevation of  to . The plant is very drought resistant and can tolerate cool to warm conditions. It blooms from summer to fall, producing fragrant flowers. There are usually three to four flowers on an inflorescence.

This species is highly prized and much sought after by orchid enthusiasts for its showy, highly fragrant flowers.  The plants typically produce several large, showy, intricately patterned flowers once a year which are larger in stature than the plant itself.

Cultivation 

The plants are easy to maintain in culture provided they receive high light levels and moderate humidity throughout the year.  They can be grown in pots of large diameter bark, but do best mounted on plaques of decay resistant, untreated wood, bare root.  Although these plants are found in dry oak forests which experience low precipitation, the humidity is moderately high most of the year.  These plants can tolerate low humidity but will exhibit poor root growth and a decline in the size of new growth in successive years.  The plants might not grow or break dormancy if they do not receive high light levels and moderate humidity throughout the year.

They must not be watered at all during the months of December through April, or they will not flower, and watering during that period can cause them to lose their roots and decline.  During dormancy, the pseudo-bulbs will dehisce, with the oldest ones being totally consumed, and the succulent leaves appearing to remain turgid and firm on the most recent pseudobulbs.  When the plants start to show evidence of a flower spike from the terminal end of the most recent pseudobulbs, then the plants can be watered.  If the plants continue to dehisce past April with no evidence of flowers, then they should be watered anyway and may bloom the following year, as some plants flower irregularly when younger or they may have not received enough light throughout the year to flower.

They require very high light levels and a cool rest during the winter, with abundant water and feeding during active growth, but they must be allowed to dry completely between waterings.  These plants require good air movement around their roots and do not thrive in excessive temperatures.  High temperatures or low humidity will cause them to enter a period of dormancy in cultivation and cease to grow.

Varieties 
Alba: a Laelia speciosa with fully white flowers

References 

speciosa
Endemic orchids of Mexico